Cook County Board of Commissioners 4th district is a electoral district for the Cook County Board of Commissioners.

The district was established in 1994, when the board transitioned from holding elections in individual districts, as opposed to the previous practice of holding a set of two at-large elections (one for ten seats from the city of Chicago and another for seven seats from suburban Cook County).

Geography
Since its inception, the district has represented parts of the South Side of Chicago and the southwest suburbs of Cook County.

1994 boundaries
In its initial 1994 iteration, the district encompassed parts of the South Side of Chicago as well as the southwest suburbs of Cook County.

2001 redistricting
New boundaries were adopted in August 2001, with redistricting taking place following the 2000 United States Census.

In regards to townships and equivalent jurisdictions, the district's redistricted boundaries included portions of the city of Chicago and portions of Thornton Township.

2012 redistricting
The district currently, as redistricted in 2012 following the 2010 United States Census, includes parts of Burnham, Calumet City, Chicago, Dolton, Evergreen, Lansing, South Holland.

In regards to townships and equivalent jurisdictions, it includes portions of the city of Chicago, and portions of Bloom, Thornton and Worth townships.

The portion of Chicago represented by the district is the extreme southwest edge of the city, including the Lake Calumet region.

The district is 57.57 square miles (36,844.00 acres).

Politics
All commissioners representing this district, since its inception, have been Democrats. The district has voted strongly Democratic in its Cook County Board of Commissioners elections.

List of commissioners representing the district

Election results

|-
| colspan=16 style="text-align:center;" |Cook County Board of Commissioners 4th district general elections
|-
!Year
!Winning candidate
!Party
!Vote (pct)
!Opponent
!Party
! Vote (pct)
|-
|1994
| |John H. Stroger, Jr.
| |Democratic
| | 
|Text style="background:#D2B48C | Bruce Crosby
|Text style="background:#D2B48C |Harold Washington Party
|Text style="background:#D2B48C | 
|-
|1998
| |John H. Stroger, Jr.
| | Democratic
| |91,847 (100%)
|
|
|
|-
|2002
| |John H. Stroger, Jr.
| | Democratic
| |86,415 (93.12%)
| | Nathan Peoples
| |Republican
| | 6,385 (6.88%)
|-
|2006
| |William Beavers
| | Democratic
| |78,252 (91.54%)
| | Ann Rochelle Hunter
| | Republican
| | 7,234 (8.46%)
|-
|2010
| |William Beavers
| | Democratic
| |81,046 (90.58%)
| | Joseph A. Barton
| | Green
| | 8,431 (9.42%)
|-
|2014
| |Stanley Moore
| | Democratic
| |75,192 (100%)
| 
| 
| 
|-
|2018
| |Stanley Moore
| | Democratic
| |88,736 (100%)
| 
| 
| 
|-
|2022
| |Stanley Moore
| | Democratic
| |67,481 (90.56%)
| | Lynn Franco
| | Republican
| | 7,036 (9.44%)

References

Cook County Board of Commissioners districts
Constituencies established in 1994
1994 establishments in Illinois